Wim De Vocht (born 29 April 1982) is a Belgian retired professional road bicycle racer, who competed as a professional between 2004 and 2012.

His sister Liesbet De Vocht is also a former professional cyclist.

Palmarès 

1998
3rd National Under-17 Time Trial Championships
2000
1st  National Under-19 Road Race Championships
2nd National Under-19 Time Trial Championships
2002

2003
1st Ronde Van Vlaanderen Beloften
3rd GP Istria 3
6th Zesbergenprijs Harelbeke
6th Duo Normand
7th Zellik–Galmaarden
2005
2nd Memorial Rik Van Steenbergen
2006
9th Omloop Het Volk
2010
8th Ronde van het Groene Hart

References

External links 
Personal website
 

Belgian male cyclists
1982 births
Living people
Sportspeople from Turnhout
Cyclists from Antwerp Province